The 5th Australian Academy of Cinema and Television Arts Awards (generally known as AACTA Awards) are a series of awards which includes the 5th AACTA Awards Luncheon, the 5th AACTA Awards ceremony and the 5th AACTA International Awards. The former two events were held at The Star Event Centre, in Sydney, New South Wales in late 2015. Presented by the Australian Academy of Cinema and Television Arts (AACTA), the awards celebrate the best in Australian feature film, television, documentary and short film productions of 2015. The AACTA Awards ceremony televised on Seven Network for the fourth year running. The 5th AACTA Awards are a continuum of the Australian Film Institute Awards (known as the AFI Awards), established in 1958 and presented until 2010 after which it was rebranded the AACTA Awards when the Australian Film Institute (AFI) established AACTA in 2011.

The nominees were announced during a press conference on 31 October 2015 at The Star hôtel in Sydney. The Dressmaker received the most feature-film nominations with thirteen, earning a nomination in most of the categories.

Nominees and winners
The nominees for feature-films and Television were announced during a press conference on 29 October 2015 in Sydney. Of the nominees, Jocelyn Moorhouse's revenge drama The Dressmaker received the most feature-film nominations with thirteen, including Best Film, Best Direction, Best Lead Actress, Best Supporting Actress, Best Cinematography, Best Editing, Best Production Design and Best Costume Design. The winners were announced on 9 December 2015.

Feature film
{| class=wikitable style="width:90%"
|-
! style="background:#DBD090;" ! style="width:50%" | Best Film
! style="background:#DBD090;" ! style="width:50%" | Best Direction
|-
| valign="top" |
Mad Max: Fury Road – Doug Mitchell, George Miller, and P. J. VoetenThe Dressmaker – Sue Maslin
Holding the Man – Kylie Du Fresne
Last Cab to Darwin – Greg Duffy, Lisa Duff, and Jeremy Sims 
Paper Planes – Robert Connolly, Maggie Miles, and Liz Kearney 
| valign="top" |George Miller – Mad Max: Fury Road
Jocelyn Moorhouse – The Dressmaker
Neil Armfield – Holding the Man  
Jeremy Sims – Last Cab to Darwin
|-
! style="background:#DBD090;" ! style="width="50%" | Best Original Screenplay
! style="background:#DBD090;" ! style="width="50%" | Best Adapted Screenplay
|-
| valign="top" |
Paper Planes – Robert Connolly, and Steve WorlandCut Snake – Blake Ayshford
Kill Me Three Times – James McFarland
Mad Max: Fury Road – George Miller, Brendan McCarthy, and Nico Lathouris
| valign="top" |Last Cab to Darwin – Reg Cribb and Jeremy Sims, based on the play of the same name by Reg Cribb
Holding the Man – Tommy Murphy, based on the memoir of the same name by Timothy Conigrave
Ruben Guthrie – Brendan Cowell, based on the play of the same name by Brendan Cowell
|-
! style="background:#DBD090;" ! style="width="50%" | Best Lead Actor
! style="background:#DBD090;" ! style="width="50%" | Best Lead Actress
|-
| valign="top" |Michael Caton – Last Cab to Darwin as RexPatrick Brammall – Ruben Guthrie as Ruben Guthrie
Ryan Corr – Holding the Man as Timothy Conigrave
Sullivan Stapleton – Cut Snake as James
| valign="top" |Kate Winslet – The Dressmaker as Myrtle "Tilly" DunnageRobyn Butler – Now Add Honey as Caroline Morgan
Ningali Lawford – Last Cab to Darwin as Polly
Charlize Theron – Mad Max: Fury Road as Imperator Furiosa
|-
! style="background:#DBD090;" ! style="width="50%" | Best Supporting Actor
! style="background:#DBD090;" ! style="width="50%" | Best Supporting Actress
|-
| valign="top" |Hugo Weaving – The Dressmaker as Sergeant FarratMark Coles Smith – Last Cab to Darwin as Tilly
Alex Dimitriades – Ruben Guthrie as Damian
Anthony LaPaglia – Holding the Man as Bob Caleo
| valign="top" |Judy Davis – The Dressmaker as Molly DunnageEmma Hamilton – Last Cab to Darwin as Julie
Deborah Mailman – Paper Planes as Maureen
Sarah Snook – The Dressmaker as Gertrude "Trudy" Pratt
|-
! style="background:#DBD090;" ! style="width="50%" | Best Cinematography
! style="background:#DBD090;" ! style="width="50%" | Best Editing
|-
| valign="top" |Mad Max: Fury Road – John Seale ASC ACSThe Dressmaker – Donald McAlpine ACS ASC 
Last Cab to Darwin – Steve Arnold ACS 
Oddball – Damian Wyvill ACS
| valign="top" |Mad Max: Fury Road – Margaret SixelCut Snake – Andy Canny
The Dressmaker – Jill Bilcock ACE ASE
Holding the Man – Dany Cooper ASE
|-
! style="background:#DBD090;" ! style="width="50%" | Best Original Music Score
! style="background:#DBD090;" ! style="width="50%" | Best Sound
|-
| valign="top" |Mad Max: Fury Road – Junkie XLThe Dressmaker – David Hirschfelder
Paper Planes – Nigel Westlake
Partisan – Daniel Lopatin
| valign="top" |Mad Max: Fury Road – Ben Osmo, David White, Chris Jenkins, Gregg Rudloff, Wayne Pashley, and Mark ManginiThe Dressmaker – Andrew Ramage, Glenn Newnham, Chris Goodes CAS, David Williams, Mario Vaccaro, and Alex Francis 
Paper Planes – Chris Goodes CAS, James Ashton, Emma Bortignon, and Trevor Hope
Partisan – Robert Mackenzie, and Dane Cody 
|-
! style="background:#DBD090;" ! style="width="50%" | Best Production Design
! style="background:#DBD090;" ! style="width="50%" | Best Costume Design
|-
| valign="top" |Mad Max: Fury Road – Colin GibsonCut Snake – Josephine Ford
The Dressmaker – Roger Ford
Partisan – Steven Jones-Evans APDG, and Sarah Cyngler 
| valign="top" |The Dressmaker – Marion Boyce, and Margot WilsonCut Snake – Cappi Ireland
Mad Max: Fury Road – Jenny Beavan
Partisan – Sarah Cyngler 
|-
|}

Television
{| class=wikitable style="width:90%"
|-
! style="background:#DBD090;" ! style="width:50%" | Best Drama Series
! style="background:#DBD090;" ! style="width:50%" | Best Comedy Series
|-
| valign="top" |Glitch – Tony Ayres, Louise Fox and Ewan Burnett (ABC)
Love Child (Season 2) – Tom Hoffie (Nine Network)
Miss Fisher's Murder Mysteries (Season 3) – Fiona Eagger and Deb Cox (ABC)
Wentworth (Season 3) – Jo Porter and Amanda Crittenden (FOXTEL)
| valign="top" |
Shaun Micallef's Mad as Hell – Shaun Micallef, Peter Beck (ABC)
Danger 5 – Kate Croser, Dario Russo (SBS)
Sammy J & Randy in Ricketts Lane – Laura Waters, Andrea Denholm, Paul Walton, and Peter Helliar (ABC)
Utopia – Michael Hirsh, Santo Cilauro, Tom Gleisner, Rob Sitch (ABC)
|-
! style="background:#DBD090;" ! style="width="50%" | Best Children's Series
! style="background:#DBD090;" ! style="width="50%" | Best Light Entertainment Series
|-
| valign="top" |
Ready for This – Darren  Dale, Miranda Dear and Joanna Werner (ABC3)
Little Lunch – Robyn Butler and Wayne Hope (ABC3)
The New Adventures of Figaro Pho – Daniel Fill, Frank Verheggen and Luke Jurevicius (ABC3)
Nowhere Boys Series 2 – Beth Frey (ABC3)
| valign="top" |
The Weekly with Charlie Pickering – Charlie Pickering, Kevin Whyte, Chris Walker and Frank Bruzzese (ABC)
Dirty Laundry Live – Tarni James, Peter Lawler, Rachel Millar and Richard Kelly (ABC)
Judith Lucy is All Woman – Anna Bateman, Judith Lucy (ABC)
Julia Zemiro's Home Delivery – Damian Davis, Polly Connolly and Nick Murray (ABC)
|-
! style="background:#DBD090;" ! style="width="50%" | Best Reality Series
! style="background:#DBD090;" ! style="width="50%" | Best Telefeature, Mini Series or Short Run Series
|-
| valign="top" |
MasterChef Australia – Margaret Bashfield, Marty Benson, Tim Toni and Rob Wallace (Network Ten)My Kitchen Rules (Season 6) – Rikkie Proost, Evan Wilkes and Matt Apps (Seven Network)
The Real Housewives of Melbourne (Season 2) – Kylie Washington, Lisa Potasz, Virginia Hodgson (FOXTEL)
The Voice – Richard Rietveld (Nine Network) 
The X Factor – Digby Mitchell (Seven Network)
| valign="top" |Peter Allen: Not the Boy Next Door – Kerrie Mainwaring and Rory Callaghan (Seven Network)Banished – Sita Williams, Emile Sherman, Iain Canning, Jamie Laurenson and Brett Popplewell (FOXTEL)
The Principal – Ian Collie (SBS)
The Secret River – Stephen Luby (ABC)
|-
! style="background:#DBD090;" ! style="width="50%" | Best Direction in a Drama or Comedy
! style="background:#DBD090;" ! style="width="50%" | Best Direction in a Television Light Entertainment or Reality Series
|-
| valign="top" |Shawn Seet –  Peter Allen: Not the Boy Next Door (Épisode 2) (Seven Network)Jeffrey Walker – Banished (Épisode 7) (FOXTEL)
Michael Rymer – Deadline Gallipoli (Part 1) (FOXTEL)
Kriv Stenders – The Principal (Épisode 1) (SBS)
| valign="top" |Seth Larney – Hipsters (Épisode 1) (SBS2)
Anna Bateman – Judith Lucy is All Woman (Épisode 2) (ABC)
Damian Davis – Julia Zemiro's Home Delivery (Épisode 7) (ABC)
Stamatia Maroupas – Kitchen Cabinet (Épisode 7) (ABC)
|-
! style="background:#DBD090;" ! style="width="50%" | Best Lead Actor – Drama
! style="background:#DBD090;" ! style="width="50%" | Best Lead Actress – Drama
|-
| valign="top" |
Joel Jackson – Peter Allen: Not the Boy Next Door  (Seven Network)
Wayne Blair –  Redfern Now (ABC)
Joel Jackson – Deadline Gallipoli (FOXTEL)
Oliver Jackson-Cohen –  The Secret River (ABC)
| valign="top" |
Pamela Rabe – Wentworth (Season 3) (FOXTEL)Deborah Mailman – Redfern Now (ABC)
Peta Sergeant – House of Hancock (Nine Network)
Sarah Snook – The Secret River (ABC)
|-
! style="background:#DBD090;" ! style="width="50%" | Best Guest or Supporting Actor – Drama
! style="background:#DBD090;" ! style="width="50%" | Best Guest or Supporting Actress – Drama
|-
| valign="top" |Ky Baldwin – Peter Allen: Not the Boy Next Door (Episode 1) (Seven Network)John Bach – Gallipoli (Episode 6) (Nine Network)
Lachy Hulme – The Secret River (Part 1) (ABC)
Rahel Romahn – The Principal (Episode 2) (SBS)
| valign="top" |Sigrid Thornton – Peter Allen: Not the Boy Next Door (Épisode 1) (Seven Network)Harriet Dyer – Love Child (Season 2) (Episode 3) (Nine Network)
Rarriwuy Hick – Redfern Now (ABC)
Hannah Monson – Glitch (Episode 4) (ABC)
|-
! style="background:#DBD090;" ! style="width="50%" | Best Comedy Performance
! style="background:#DBD090;" ! style="width="50%" | Best Screenplay in Television
|-
| valign="top" |Celia Pacquola – Utopia (ABC)Nathan Lovejoy – Sammy J & Randy in Ricketts Lane (ABC)
Randy – Sammy J & Randy in Ricketts Lane (ABC)
Emily Taheny – Shaun Micallef's Mad as Hell (ABC2)
| valign="top" |Michael Miller – Peter Allen: Not the Boy Next Door (Épisode 2) (Seven Network)Jacquelin Perske and Shaun Grant – Deadline Gallipoli (Part 1) (FOXTEL)
Kristen Dunphy – The Principal (Épisode 1) (SBS)
Santo Cilauro, Tom Gleisner, Rob Sitch – Utopia (Épisode 1) (ABC)
|-
! style="background:#DBD090;" ! style="width="50%" | Best Cinematography in Television
! style="background:#DBD090;" ! style="width="50%" | Best Editing in Television
|-
| valign="top" |Geoffrey Hall – Deadline Gallipoli (FOXTEL)
Martin McGrath – Banished (Épisode 6) (FOXTEL)
Mark Wareham – Redfern Now (ABC)
Bruce Young – The Secret River (Épisode 1) (ABC)
| valign="top" |
Nicholas Holmes – Redfern Now (ABC)
Dany Cooper and Martin Connor – Deadline Gallipoli (Part 1) (FOXTEL)
Annabelle Johnson – Little Lunch (Épisode 5) (ABC3)
Deborah Peart  – Peter Allen: Not the Boy Next Door (Épisode 1) (Seven Network)
|-
! style="background:#DBD090;" ! style="width="50%" | Best Sound in Television
! style="background:#DBD090;" ! style="width="50%" | Best Original Music Score in Television
|-
| valign="top" |
Des Kenneally, Robert Mackenzie, Liam Price, Jed Dodge, Justine Angus and John Simpson – Deadline Gallipoli (Par 1) (FOXTEL)
Paul 'Salty' Brincat, Gary Desmond and Dan Johnson – Banished (Épisode 6) (FOXTEL)
Grant Shepherd, Ashley Irwin, Ian Neilson, Ben Anderson, Nigel Croydon, Robert Sullivan – Peter Allen: Not the Boy Next Door (Épisode 1) (Seven Network)
Rainier Davenport, Ian McLoughlin CAS, Wes Chew, Tom Herdman, Annie Breslin and Blair Slater – Redfern Now (ABC)
| valign="top" |
Cornel Wilczek – Glitch (ABC)
David Bridie – Deadline Gallipoli (Part 1) (FOXTEL)
Antony Partos – Redfern Now (ABC)
Burkhard Dallwitz – The Secret River (Part 1) (ABC)
|-
! style="background:#DBD090;" ! style="width="50%" | Best Production Design in Television
! style="background:#DBD090;" ! style="width="50%" | Best Costume Design in Television
|-
| valign="top" |
Herbert Pinter – The Secret River (Part 1) (ABC)
Claire Kenny – Banished (Épisode 6) (FOXTEL)
Pete Baxter – Deadline Gallipoli (Part 1) (FOXTEL)
Tim Ferrier – Peter Allen: Not the Boy Next Door (Épisode 1) (Seven Network)
| valign="top" |
Jenny Miles – Peter Allen: Not the Boy Next Door (Épisode 1) (Seven Network)
Shareen Beringer – House of Hancock (Part 1) (Nine Network)
Marion Boyce – Miss Fisher's Murder Mysteries (Épisode 1) (ABC)
Edie Kurzer – The Secret River (ABC)
|-
|}

Documentary

Short film

Other

Productions with multiple nominations

Feature film

The following feature films received multiple nominations.

 Thirteen: The Dressmaker Twelve: Mad Max: Fury Road Nine: Last Cab to Darwin Six: Paper Planes, Holding the Man Five: Cut Snake Four: Partisan Three: Ruben Guthrie Two: Oddball''

References

External links
 The Australian Academy of Cinema and Television Arts official website
 Official broadcast website at Yahoo7

AACTA Awards ceremonies
AACTA Awards
AACTA Awards
AACTA Awards